The Leeward Islands cricket team is a first class cricket team representing the member countries of the Leeward Islands Cricket Association, an associate of the West Indies Cricket Board. Antigua and Barbuda, Saint Kitts, Nevis, Anguilla, Montserrat, British Virgin Islands, US Virgin Islands and Sint Maarten are members of the Leeward Islands Cricket Association. The team does not participate in any international competitions (though Antigua and Barbuda took part at the 1998 Commonwealth Games), but rather in inter-regional competitions in the Caribbean, such as the Regional Four Day Competition and the Regional Super50) The team competes in regional cricket under the franchise name Leeward Islands Hurricanes. The Leeward Islands has won a total of ten domestic titles – four in first class cricket and six in one-day cricket, but their last title was in 1997–98 when they won the double (although the first-class title was shared with Guyana). The list of prominent cricketers who have played for the Leewards Islands includes Curtly Ambrose, Eldine Baptiste, Kenny Benjamin, Winston Benjamin, Sheldon Cottrell, George Ferris, Ridley Jacobs, Viv Richards, Richie Richardson, Andy Roberts and Hayden Walsh Jr.

History
The Leeward Islands played their inaugural first-class game in 1958, and lost by an innings and 19 runs to Jamaica. However, their first win did not come until 1968–69, when they beat Guyana by 43 runs at the Warner Park Sporting Complex ground. From 1965–66 to 1980–81 the team competed as the Combined Islands in first-class cricket, along with the best cricketers from the Windward Islands. However, when regular one-day competitions began in 1975–76 the island groups were separate, and the Leeward Islands won on their third outing in 1977–78.

In 1981–82 the Leeward Islands made their debut in the Shell Shield with a 57-run win over the Windward Islands (the season after the Combined Islands had won the title), but it was to take eight seasons until they could lift the first-class trophy – which by then had been renamed the Red Stripe Cup. From 1989–90 to 1997–98, however, the Leeward Islands won five first-class titles (one shared) and four one-day titles (one shared), but since then they have failed to win any major trophy in the West Indies.

Squad

Notable players

The list of prominent cricketers who have represented the Leeward Islands includes:

 Curtly Ambrose
 Kenny Benjamin
 Winston Benjamin
 Ridley Jacobs
 Viv Richards
 Richie Richardson
 Andy Roberts
 Eldine Baptiste
 Sylvester Joseph
 Sheldon Cotterell
 Keith Arthurton
 Derick Parry
 Stuart Williams
 Runako Morton
 Kieran Powell
 Omari Banks
 Lionel Baker
 Adam Sanford

Grounds 
The Leeward Islands play cricket on all the islands, though the only ground to have seen Test cricket (and also the ground with the most home matches, with 50 first-class games) is the Antigua Recreation Ground. However, their last match at the ARG was in February 2009, while another traditional ground, Warner Park in St Kitts, with 28 first-class games with Leeward Islands, was revamped for the 2007 Cricket World Cup. In the 2004–05 season, the Leeward Islands played their home games at Salem Oval (Montserrat), Edgar Gilbert Sporting Complex (Saint Kitts), Carib Lumber Ball Park (Sint Maarten), Addelita Cancryn Junior High School Ground (St. Thomas) and Grove Park (Nevis).

Honours 
 Regional Four Day Competition (4): 1989–90, 1993–94, 1995–96, 1997–98 (shared)
 Domestic one-day competition (7): 1977–78 (shared), 1981–82, 1992–93 (shared), 1993–94, 1994–95, 1997–98, 2010–11

References

External links
 Cricinfo
 Leeward Islands at CricketArchive
 Leeward Islands Cricket – Info from West Indies Cricket Board

West Indian first-class cricket teams
Cricket in Antigua and Barbuda
Cricket in Saint Kitts and Nevis
Cricket in Anguilla
Cricket in the British Virgin Islands
Cricket in Montserrat
Cricket in the United States Virgin Islands
Cricket in the Leeward Islands
Cricket clubs established in 1980
1980 establishments in North America